Peter Burns (January 1870 - death date unknown) was a Negro leagues catcher for several years before the founding of the first Negro National League.

Little is known about Burns at this time, but records show him on teams lists and in newspaper reports from 1890 to 1900.

He played with several of the big players of the day, such as Chappie Johnson, Charlie Grant, Sherman Barton, and he caught for the famous pitcher of the day George Wilson. During his time with the Page Fence Giants, Burns often caught for Bill Holland.

References

External links
 and Seamheads

Chicago Unions players
Columbia Giants players
Page Fence Giants players
Baseball players from Alabama
20th-century deaths
1870 births
Year of death missing
20th-century African-American people
Baseball catchers